Tatabánya is a city with county rights of 64,305 inhabitants in northwestern Hungary, in the Central Transdanubian region. It is the capital of Komárom-Esztergom County.

Location
By virtue of its location, the city is a railway and road junction. The M1 (also European routes E60, E75) motorway from Vienna to Budapest passes through the outer city limits, and the Vienna-Budapest railway line also passes through the city.

History
Archaeological findings prove that humans have been living here since the Stone Age. The three historic predecessor settlements of Tatabánya are Alsógalla, Felsőgalla, and Bánhida. Bánhida is the earliest settlement, it was first mentioned in 1288.

In the 16th century, the Ottoman Turks occupied the area. Around this time, the inhabitants became Protestants. Later, its feudal lords, the Esterházys populated the area with Roman Catholic German and Slovak settlers.

According to the 1787 census, Alsógalla had 580 and Felsőgalla had 842 inhabitants. The coal resources of the area were discovered around this time. The population began to grow, and a new mining colony was formed, later developing into the village of Tatabánya. 

During the industrialization wave that took over the country after World War II, several Hungarian towns developed into large industrial cities.  The four villages were united on October 1, 1947, under the name Tatabánya and it was elevated to town status.  In 1950, it became the county capital of Komárom-Esztergom county (then called Komárom county.)  By the 1980s, it had more than 80,000 inhabitants. 

The industrial character of the city was significant until the fall of the Socialist government and the following political changes of 1989.  After that, the importance of heavy industry and mining decreased and the economic structure of the city has changed remarkably.

Infrastructure

According to the 2001 census, Tatabánya had 28,912 households and 92% of them had central heating and telephone access. Almost all households have access to the cable TV network. 98% of the city roads are paved, mass transport is well organized.
T-Busz provides local bus services and KNYKK provides the regional bus services.

Education

Until the mid-20th century, educational standards in the city were average, but in the second half of the century they deteriorated to below average, mostly because the local mines did not require their employees to have a high level of education. By the end of the 20th century, this trend had reversed again. The city currently has two colleges, ten secondary schools, 16 primary schools, 18 kindergartens, and five crèches.

Culture and sports
The most important cultural institution is the Mari Jászai Theatre. The city has several other institutions, including museums and libraries.

Tatabánya has a football team called FC Tatabánya, founded in 1910. The town also has a successful handball team, Tatabánya Carbonex KC.

One of Tatabánya's most prominent residents is József Kiprich, formally known as "the Wizard from Tatabánya". He became the top goalscorer in the Hungarian League in 1985, scoring 18 goals in 26 matches. In total, he played nine seasons at Tatabánya before making the move to the Netherlands. He had just played his first match in his 10th season at Tatabánya when Feyenoord of Rotterdam got interested in signing him. Kiprich didn't hesitate and signed a contract and left Tatabánya for Rotterdam. He is also one of Hungary's top goal scorers. In eleven seasons of football with the Hungarian national team, "the Wizard" managed to score 28 goals in 70 appearances.

Sights
The Turul monument, above the city on the top of Gerecse Mountain, is the largest bird statue in Central Europe.

The Szelim cave and the forest park of Gerecse Mountain are local tourist attractions.

Politics
The mayor of Tatabánya is Ilona Szücsné Posztovics (DK).

The local Municipal Assembly, elected at the 2019 local government elections, is made up of 18 members (1 Mayor, 12 Individual constituencies MEPs and 5 Compensation List MEPs) divided into this political parties and alliances:

List of mayors
List of City Mayors since 1990:

Town districts
Tatabánya is divided into eight districts:

Alsógalla
Sárberek
Újváros
Bánhida
Kertváros
Dózsakert
Felsőgalla
Óváros

Nearby villages
Gyermely
Héreg
Környe
Szárliget
Szomor
Tarján
Tardos
Várgesztes
Vértessomló
Vértesszőlős

Notable people

Éva Csernoviczki (born 1986), judoka
Rita Deli (born 1972), handball player
András Dombai (born 1979), footballer
Bernadett Ferling (born 1977), handball player
Ádám Gyurcsó (born 1991), football winger
Anita Herr (born 1987), handball player
Orsolya Herr (born 1984), handball player
Viktor Kassai (born 1975), football referee
Andrea Keszler (born 1989), short-track speed-skater
Klára Killermann (1929-2012), breaststroke swimmer
Béla Kovács (born 1937), clarinetist
László Kovács (born 1951), football goalkeeper
Zsolt Kunyik (born 1974), judoka
Csaba Kuzma (born 1954), light-heavyweight boxer
Ferenc Machos (1934-2006), footballer
Viktória Pácz (born 1990), handball player
Josef Papp (1933-1989), American engineer
Csaba Schmidt (born 1979), chemist and politician, mayor of Tatabánya
Szandra Szalay (born 1989), triathlete
Patricia Szölösi (born 1991), handballer
László Szűcs (born 1991), footballer
István Vincze (born 1967), footballer
Miklos Feher (1979-2004) footballer

Twin towns – sister cities

Tatabánya is twinned with:

 Aalen, Germany (1987)
 Banská Štiavnica, Slovakia (2017)
 Będzin, Poland (2000)
 Christchurch, United Kingdom (1992)
 Fairfield, United States (1993)
 Odorheiu Secuiesc, Romania (2000)
 Izhevsk, Russia (1992)

Town partnerships
Tatabánya also maintains partnerships with:
 Arad, Romania
 Hoogezand-Sappemeer, Netherlands
 Nové Zámky, Slovakia
 Saint-Ghislain, Belgium
 Saint-Lô, France

Gallery

References

Notes

External links

Civertan.hu, Aerial photography: Tatabánya

 
County seats in Hungary
Cities with county rights of Hungary
Populated places in Komárom-Esztergom County
Hungarian German communities
Planned cities in Hungary